Kenny Ho is a stylist and costume designer. He is the stylist to celebrities including the Spice Girls and Westlife.

Career 
Kenny Ho started off is education in Daniel Stewart’s and Melville College in Edinburgh. 

Kenny Ho studied costume design at the Wimbledon School of arts in London. While still in school, Ho received his first commission, assisting in costume design for David Bowie.

Spice Girls

After graduating in 1996, Ho started working with the Spice Girls as a wardrobe assistant on their film Spiceworld. He later became the group's personal stylist. He designed all the costumes for their 1998 Spiceworld Tour.

Ho also the stylist for Geri Halliwell's 1999 solo debut. He also worked as stylist for Spice Girls members Victoria Beckham, Melanie C, and Emma Bunton after the group broke up.

Other work
Ho's clients also include pianist Myleene Klass and Girls Aloud.

Ho created the costumes for The Borrowers film starring John Goodman.

References

External links 

Kenny Ho Official Website
Interview

Year of birth missing (living people)
Living people
Chinese emigrants to the United States
American costume designers
Chinese fashion designers
Fashion designers from London
Artists from New York City